Jonathan Alden "Jon" Merrill (born May 25, 1945) is an American fandom editor and collector who, with Tricia Trozzi, was the co-president of the International Annie Fan Club from 1983 to 1998, and the co-editor of the Annie People newsletter.

A native of Washington, D.C., Merrill was featured in the 2006 award-winning documentary film Life After Tomorrow directed by Gil Cates Jr. and Julie Stevens.

References

External links
 

Living people
1945 births
People from Washington, D.C.